John "Lefty" Phillips (born 1918) was an American professional baseball pitcher in the Negro leagues. He played with the Baltimore Elite Giants in 1939 and 1940.

References

External links
 and Seamheads

Baltimore Elite Giants players
1918 births
Baseball pitchers
Baseball players from Tennessee
Year of death missing